Santutxu Fútbol Club is a Spanish football team based in Bilbao, in the autonomous community of Basque Country. Founded in 1918, it plays in Tercera División RFEF – Group 4, holding home matches at Estadio Maiona, which has a capacity of 4.000 spectators.

Ibai Gómez, of Athletic Bilbao and Alavés, began his footballing career at Santutxu.

Season to season

21 seasons in Tercera División
1 season in Tercera División RFEF

See also
:Category:Santutxu FC players

References

External links
Official website 
Futbolme team profile 
Soccerway team profile

Sports teams in Bilbao
Football clubs in the Basque Country (autonomous community)
Association football clubs established in 1918
1918 establishments in Spain